Istanbul Tales is a 2005 Turkish drama-anthology film, directed by Selim Demirdelen, Kudret Sabancı, Ümit Ünal, Yücel Yolcu and Ömür Atay, which tells five interconnected stories set in modern-day Istanbul based on the fairytales Snow White, Cinderella, Pied Piper, Sleeping Beauty and Little Red Riding Hood. The film, which went on nationwide general release on 11 March 2005, won several awards including Best Film at the 24th International Istanbul Film Festival.

Awards
The film won the Best Film of the Year and Best Actress awards at the 2005 Istanbul International Film Festival, Special Jury Prize at the 2006 Bangkok International Film Festival and Jury Prize of "Artistic Expression" (Original Idea) at the 2005 MedFilm Festival in Rome.

Cast
Altan Erkekli as Hilmi, the Clarinetist
Özgü Namal as Senay, his Wife
Mehmet Günsür as Rifki, her Lover
Erkan Can as Erkan, the Drummer
Azra Akın as Idil
Çetin Tekindor as Ihsan, the Mafia Boss
Vahide Gördüm as Hurrem, the Wicked Queen
Nejat İşler as Ramazan, the Killer
Hilal Aslan as Dwarf #8
Yelda Reynaud as Banu, the Transsexual
Şevket Çoruh as Recep, her Pimp
Given Kirac as Mimi, the Transvestite
İsmail Hacıoğlu as Fiko
Selen Ucer as Prostitute
Hasibe Eren as Prostitute
Nurgül Yeşilçay as Saliha, the Aristocrat
Selim Akgul as Musa, the Kurd
Erdem Akakce as Recai, Saliha's Brother
İdil Üner as Melek
Fikret Kuşkan as Rafet
Ahmet Memtaz Taylan as TV Journalist
Ece Hakim as Melek's Daughter

External links

 

2005 drama films
2005 LGBT-related films
2005 films
Anthology films
Best Picture Golden Boll Award winners
Films set in Istanbul
Films set in Turkey
Turkish drama films
Turkish LGBT-related films
2000s Turkish-language films